Revenge is a 2017 French action thriller film written and directed by Coralie Fargeat, and starring Matilda Lutz, Kevin Janssens, Vincent Colombe and Guillaume Bouchède. The plot follows a young woman who is raped and assaulted and left for dead in the desert by three men, where she recovers and seeks vengeance upon her attackers.

Revenge had its world premiere on 11 September 2017 at the Toronto International Film Festival, as part of the Midnight Madness section. The film was released theatrically in France on 7 February 2018 by Rezo Films, and received critical acclaim, with praise for the screenplay, direction, cinematography, and Lutz's performance.

Plot
Jennifer (dubbed "Jen"), an American socialite, is in a secret relationship with a married Richard. The two fly out to Richard's secluded home in the middle of the desert for a weekend tryst before his annual hunting trip with friends Stan and Dimitri. Stan and Dimitri arrive a day early, disappointing Richard, who was hoping to keep Jen a secret. That night the three men and Jen have a fun night of drinking and dancing.

The next morning, while Richard is away, Stan tries to initiate sex with Jen, claiming she had come on to him the night before. When she refuses, he rapes her. Dimitri sees the rape but ignores it. Richard returns, berates Stan, and offers Jen money to forget about the incident. Jen demands to be sent home and threatens to reveal their relationship to Richard's wife. Richard slaps Jen and she runs off into the desert, pursued by the three men give chase. Cornering Jen at a cliff, Richard pushes her off, and she is impaled on a tree. The trio return to the house, planning to retrieve her body later.

After a while, Jen wakes up and painfully frees herself. She wanders the desert with a piece of the tree branch stuck in her torso, trying to avoid the three men, who realized she survived the fall and had split up to search. Jen catches Dimitri alone and after a brief fight, manages to stab both of his eyes with his hunting knife. He bleeds out as Jen takes his supplies. She hides in a cave and treats her injuries. After a series of nightmares of the men hunting her, Jen sets out to find them first. 

After Richard and Stan discover and dispose of Dimitri's body, Richard orders Stan to track Jen down in his SUV. Jen spots Stan first and ambushes him when he runs out of gas. A gunfight ensues, ending with Jen killing him with Dimitri's shotgun and takes the car.

Richard returns to the house, calls the helicopter, and takes a shower, but hears a noise and searches the property for Jen. She finds him once he has given up and shoots him in the stomach. The two chase each other around the house with shotguns, and Richard knocks Jen out with his shotgun. He tries to strangle her, but she shoves her hand in his stomach wound, forcing him to drop her. Jen recovers her shotgun and shoots Richard in the chest, killing him. A bloodied but triumphant Jen walks out of the house and turns around as she hears the helicopter approach.

Cast
 Matilda Lutz as Jen
 Kevin Janssens  as Richard
 Vincent Colombe as Stan
 Guillaume Bouchède as Dimitri
 Jean-Louis Tribes as Roberto

Production

Development 
Coralie Fargeat was inspired to make a revenge film in the vein of Mad Max or Rambo, "with strong characters on a phantasmagoric journey." Though Fargeat was aware of the rape and revenge film genre, she did not set out to make a film of that type and had never seen I Spit On Your Grave, one of the most well-known films of the genre. Said Fargeat, "I wanted to take this story out of the genre of horror. I didn’t want Jen to be screaming and suffering for the whole movie, trying to survive. I wanted her to go somewhere else and transform into a cool and badass character." One of Fargeat's inspirations was the Steven Spielberg film Duel because it manages to generate tension using "so few elements: a car, a truck and that’s it."

Filming 
Revenge was filmed at a Moroccan location, chosen for the nondescript, isolated appearance of its desert. Said Fargeat, "We had to find the villa, the desert, and the water in the same country. I loved the idea of not being able to recognize exactly where the desert is." A small village in the background of the villa was not filmed "to create the sense that the characters in the film are totally alone."

Principal photography on the film began on 6 February and wrapped on 21 March 2017. 

Of the film's early scenes that view Jen through a male gaze and show her dancing with men, Fargeat said this was done because she "wanted to embrace the fascinating, polarising image of the Lolita. Jen can be empty and stupid and an object of desire if she wants. It shouldn’t lead to [a sexual assault]." Fargeat also chose not to linger too much on the rape scene, saying, "For me that’s not what the film’s about. So I didn’t feel the need to make it visually important. Before she is raped, she’s told it’s her fault, that she created the situation. I wanted to deal with the psychological and verbal violence towards her — the rape is symbolic of the way she’s considered and treated."

Release
The film had its world premiere at the Toronto International Film Festival on 11 September 2017. Prior to that, Shudder acquired distribution rights to the film. It was later revealed Neon would distribute the film theatrically in the United States, before its release on Shudder.

The film was released in France on 7 February 2018 by Rézo Films. It was released in the United States on 11 May 2018, in a limited release and through video on demand.

Critical response
 

Critics praised Revenge for its subversion of rape and revenge tropes and embraced the film as a welcome addition to the genre from a female lens. Andrew Whalen of Newsweek said the film is "the closest thing to a feminist rape-revenge tale since Abel Ferraras Ms. 45." A.O. Scott of The New York Times wrote, "Blunt, bloody and stylish almost in spite of itself, Revenge is a synthesis of exploitation and feminism." Multiple critics compared the film to French New Extremity movies like High Tension and Martyrs. Christy Lemire of RogerEbert.com awarded the film 3 and ½ stars out of 4 and wrote, "with cinematographer Robrecht Heyvaert, Fargeat has created a high-contrast hellscape, a place filled with equal amounts of danger and discovery."  

Among the tropes critics said Fargeat subverts were past films’ tendency to focus on violence done to the victim character. Writing for Variety, Scott Tobias commented, "The small miracle of Revenge, an exceptionally potent and sure-handed first feature by French writer-director Coralie Fargeat, is that it adheres to the formula yet feels invigorating and new, a stylistic tour-de-force that also tweaks the sexual politics in meaningful ways." Lemire wrote, "Fargeat subverts and co-opts the male gaze, turning it into something that’s both playful and fierce." TheWraps April Wolfe appreciated that the character of Jen was nuanced and multilayered, mixing "bravada" and "vulnerability." Lutz was also lauded for her performance, with Tobias saying she rises to the emotional challenge and gives a "physical presence that’s indomitable, like a blade forged in fire", and Lemire writing she is able to "[indicate] a massive character arc without many words."

Revenge was also noted for its larger focus on the theme of rebirth. David Sims of The Atlantic wrote, "winking title aside, this is a movie more about transformation and transference than revenge. Fargeat is taking familiar, misogynistic iconography and setting it to boil, bringing all its cruelty and noxiousness to the surface. Revenge won’t be an experience every viewer can handle, but as a piece of extreme horror, it’s an intelligent and flashy debut." Lemire commented that though the process of Jen's survival "requires a great deal of suspension of disbelief...Fargeat definitely emphasizes the ‘fantasy' element of the rape-revenge fantasy genre, not only through Jen’s resourcefulness but also with the dreamlike way in which she depicts her journey toward regaining control."

In a more critical review, Lena Wilson of Slate questioned whether the film can still be considered feminist if it conforms to rape and revenge film tropes, citing Jen's skimpy costuming throughout the film as an example. Wilson argued, "If rape is the pinnacle of male disregard for female life, what do we accomplish by presenting a protagonist who gleans and internalizes that violent indifference? Our protagonist is transformed, but she converts from one male fantasy to another: wide-eyed damsel to hardened action hero." Kevin Maher of The Times voiced a similar sentiment: "Labelled a 'feminist rape-revenge movie', it takes all the traditional tenets of that most dubious of genres and simply does them again."

References

External links
 
 

2017 films
2017 action thriller films
2017 horror thriller films
2017 independent films
2017 multilingual films
2010s action horror films
2010s English-language films
2010s feminist films
2010s French-language films
English-language French films
Films scored by Robin Coudert
Films set in deserts
Films shot in Morocco
French action horror films
French action thriller films
French horror thriller films
French multilingual films
French rape and revenge films
2010s French films